The 1918 Mare Island Marines football team represented the United States Marine Corps stationed at the Mare Island Naval Shipyard in Vallejo, California, during the 1918 college football season. The team lost to the Great Lakes Navy Bluejackets in the 1919 Rose Bowl. Prior to the Rose Bowl, the team had compiled a 10–0 record, shut out seven opponents, and outscored all opponents by a combined total of 454 to 28.

The team was built around Marines from the Pacific Northwest. Dick Hanley, who had played at Washington State, was the team's quarterback. Benton Bangs, another former Washington State backfield star, joined the team in November. The team's athletic director, Lynn Coovert, was an attorney from Portland. 
Before the season began, Hanley and Coovert lobbied Washington State's football coach, William "Lone Star" Dietz, to coach the Mare Island team as part of his patriotic duty. Dietz, who had led the 1915 Washington State team to an undefeated season and a victory in the 1916 Rose Bowl, agreed to take the position.

After two early victories in September, the season was interrupted in October when the Spanish flu pandemic caused a quarantine of Mare Island. The Oakland Tribune on October 2 reported that, despite the quarantine, the football team continued its daily practice. After the quarantine was lifted, the team won eight consecutive games, including four victories during a two-week trip to the Pacific Northwest.

Schedule

References

Mare Island Marines
Mare Island Marines football seasons
Mare Island Marines football